Alois Gottfried (30 September 1901 – 28 September 1996) was an Austrian fencer. He competed in the individual and team foil competitions at the 1924 Summer Olympics.

References

External links
 

1901 births
1996 deaths
Austrian male foil fencers
Olympic fencers of Austria
Fencers at the 1924 Summer Olympics